500cc Grand Prix is a motorcycle racing game developed by Microïds which was released in 1987 on multiple platforms including the Amstrad CPC, Microsoft DOS, the Commodore 64 and the Atari ST (where it was one of the first French-made games for the system). While the graphics and animation were relatively simple, the inclusion of a multiplayer mode was well-appreciated by fans and reviewers.

Gameplay

The game provides a two-player split-screen mode and three levels of general difficulty. Players can choose between the training mode, a single Grand Prix or the whole World Championship.

During the race, the screen is always split in two vertical halves and shows the point of view of two racers. In single player mode you can choose one side of the screen which will show your motorcycle, while the other bike is a computer controlled one. In two player mode each player is given one side of the screen. The view for each half is in the third person perspective behind the bike, although at the bottom there is also a Heads Up Display showing various indicators. The controls consist of acceleration, braking, steering (which is more or less pushed at two different inclinations), and gear change between the four available gears. In the event of an accident or crash, the player only loses time and can start immediately from a stationary position where they crashed.

In the training mode there are only two laps and two racers per circuit, whereas in a single Grand Prix there are nine laps and 6 racers (except on the C64 where there are only four racers) for each circuit. The game contains a total of twelve available circuits, which are inspired by real circuits. In the DOS and Atari ST versions, there is also a save mode after every race. 

Finally in the World Championship mode, the player(s) must run all twelve circuits with the aim of obtaining a final classification/score based on their placements across all twelve races.  Just like in the Grand Prix mode each circuit contains nine laps, with six participating motorcycles (again with the exception of the C64 which only has four) and there is a save mode after each race in the DOS and Atari ST versions.

References

External links

Microïds
Play 500cc Grand Prix online 
500cc Grand Prix at thelegacy.de/Museum

1987 video games
Microïds games
Racing video games
Amstrad CPC games
Atari ST games
Commodore 64 games
DOS games
Europe-exclusive video games
Video games developed in France
Grand Prix motorcycle racing